A number of Latin biographies of Muhammad were written during the 9th to 13th centuries.

Overview
The earliest Latin biographies originated in Spain before the mid-9th century. They had a limited circulation and influence. All other Latin biographies are ultimately based on the tradition of the  Chronographia of Theophanes the Confessor (d. 818), translated into Latin in the 9th century by Anastasius Bibliothecarius, which contained a chapter on the life of Muhammad.

While Latin biographies of Muhammad in the 11th to 12th century are still in the genre of anti-hagiography, depicting Muhammad as an heresiarch, the tradition develops into the genre of picaresque novel, with Muhammad in the role of the trickster figure, in the 13th century.

The Vita Mahumeti by  Embrico of Mainz is an early example of the genre. The text,  in rhyming  leonine hexameters, was modelled on the verse hagiography of contemporaries such as Hildebert of Le Mans.  It was most likely written between 1072 and 1090. It is in the tradition of the Chronographia of Theophanes, including the account of Muhammad's epilepsy and his body being eaten by pigs after his death.

A 12th-century versions include Otia Machometi by Walter of Compiègne (c. 1155) and Vita Machometi by Adelphus.
Thirteenth-century works of the romance type, written in Old French, include the Romance of Muhammad (1258), based on the Otia.

List of works
Storia de Mahometh (before 848)
Tultusceptru de libro domni Metobii (9th/10th century)
Theophanes the Confessor, Chronicle, trans. Anastasius Bibliothecarius, in Chronographia tripartita (870s)
Embrico of Mainz, Vita Mahumeti (11th century)
Adelphus, Vita Machometi (12th century)
Walter of Compiègne, Otia de Machomete (12th century)
Apology of al-Kindi, trans. Peter of Toledo (1142), for the Corpus Cluniacense
Vita Mahometi (1221/1222)
De Machometo (13th century)
Liber Nycholay (13th century)
Where Wicked Muhammad Came From (13th century)
Book of Muhammad's Ladder, trans. Bonaventura da Siena (13th century)

See also
Medieval Christian views on Muhammad

References

Further reading

Biographies of Muhammad
Latin biographies